Dorion station is a commuter rail station operated by Exo in Vaudreuil-Dorion, Quebec, Canada. It is served by the Vaudreuil–Hudson line.  on weekdays, 10 inbound trains and 11 outbound trains on the line call at this station (in both cases, all trains on the line except one short-turned train); on weekends, all trains (four on Saturday and three on Sunday in each direction) call here.

Dorion station consists of two side platforms, with access between them via a roadway underpass about 80 metres away from the end of the platform. The station was opened in 1887; the historic station building still stands but no longer serves passengers, and was leased in 1999 to a mental health services organization.

Bus connections

CIT La Presqu'Île

References

External links
 Dorion Commuter Train Station Information (RTM)
 Dorion Commuter Train Station Schedule (RTM)

Exo commuter rail stations
Vaudreuil-Dorion
Railway stations in Montérégie